Albert Mays may refer to:

Al Mays, baseball player
Albert Mays (footballer), Welsh professional footballer and amateur cricketer